Pennant is a village in the  community of Dyffryn Arth, Ceredigion, Wales. Pennant is represented in the Senedd by Elin Jones (Plaid Cymru) and is part of the Ceredigion constituency in the House of Commons.

References

External links
Image of first car in Pennant; Ceredigion County Council

Villages in Ceredigion